Kīlauea Point National Wildlife Refuge is a National Wildlife Refuge on the northwest coast of the island of Kauai in Hawaii.

History
Kīlauea Lighthouse was built in 1913. In 1976, the Coast Guard deactivated the lighthouse and replaced it with an automatic beacon. In 1979, the lighthouse was placed on the National Register of Historic Places.

The refuge was established in 1985 to preserve and enhance seabird nesting colonies after the property was transferred from the United States Coast Guard. In 1988, the refuge was expanded to include Crater Hill and Mōkōlea Point.

Management activities
Management programs protect the seabird nesting habitat and cooperate with the State of Hawaii to monitor the nēnē population and a newly recruited Newell's shearwater population, among other native Hawaiian seabird species. Management efforts are trapping predators, under contract with Wildlife Services; mowing to provide habitat and food sources for nēnē (Branta sandvicensis); and constructing and maintaining fences to keep dogs off the refuge.
Predator control and a fence line around the perimeter of the refuge provide baseline protection to breeding seabirds and nēnē. Native and endangered plants are reintroduced and alien species removed. Native coastal plants, such as naupaka (Scaevola spp.), ilima (Sida fallax), hala (Pandanus tectorius), āheahea (Chenopodium oahuense), akoko (Euphorbia spp.), have been restored on the refuge. An endangered plant restoration program gives species such as the rare ōlulu (Brighamia insignis) a chance to survive on the point. Habitat management also includes opening and maintaining nesting areas for the recently colonizing Laysan albatross and improving feeding habitat for nēnē.

A volunteer corps of 150 helps in all facets of refuge operations. Invasive-species removal at Kahili Beach (Rock Quarry’s), where the Kilauea Stream meets the ocean is an example project.

Birds of Kilauea Point

Each year, thousands of migratory seabirds use Kīlauea Point National Wildlife Refuge for nesting, foraging, or resting. Laysan albatrosses, red-footed boobies, brown boobies, red-tailed and white-tailed tropicbirds, great frigatebirds, and wedge-tailed shearwaters all visit the refuge. In addition, migratory shorebirds, such as the kōlea, can be seen August through May. A small population of endangered nēnē were reintroduced on the refuge in the 1990s .

Ā (red-footed booby, Sula sula) are Kīlauea's most visible seabird. They nest in trees and shrubs, incubating their eggs by covering then with their large, webbed feet. These birds stay closer to land than other Hawaiian seabirds, typically returning to their roosts at night.
Mōlī (Laysan albatross, Phoebastria immutabilis) navigate across thousands of miles of open ocean to return to their nesting grounds, mostly on remote Pacific islands. They have elaborate courtship rituals, which include sky-pointing, bill-clapping, and bowing. Mōlī can be seen from November to July at Kīlauea Point.
Kaupu (black-footed albatross, Phoebastria nigripes) are large, dark gray seabirds with white around bill and under eye that can occasionally be seen flying off of Kīlauea Point. Unlike the Mōlī, it prefers windswept, sandy spots away from human habitation. A large population of kaupu nest on Midway Atoll.
Ā (brown booby, Sula leucogaster) are frequently sighted fishing offshore and seen roosting along the Nā Pali Coast, but they do not nest on Kauai. In recent years, however, nesting sites have been observed on nearby islands.
This bird seldom lands on the water because its short legs and long wingspan make it very difficult to take off from the water. The iwa snatches food from the water's surface or forces other birds to drop their catch - earning its Hawaiian language name iwa which translates to "thief". Iwa can be seen year-round at Kīlauea Point.
Koaeula (red-tailed tropicbird, Phaethon rubricauda) are gull-sized birds with white plumage and long red tail streamers. Koaeula put on spectacular aerial courtship displays during their breeding season, and nest under shrubs and on cliffs.
Koaekea (white-tailed tropicbird, Phaethon lepturus) are smaller than red-tailed tropicbirds. They nest on cliffs and can also be seen at Waimea Canyon and Nā Pali Coast State Parks on Kauai. They are gull-sized birds have white plumage and long tail streamers.
Nēnē (Hawaiian goose, Branta sandvicensis) have dark furrows on their cream colored necks, long legs, and reduced foot webbing. They feed on tender leaves, grasses, and berries. Nēnē disappeared from Kaua 100 years ago. With the escape of captive pairs into the wild in 1982 and active reintroduction efforts, they are now making a comeback.
Kōlea (Pacific golden plover, Pluvialis fulva) migrate to Hawaii in the fall from their arctic breeding grounds. These shorebirds establish winter feeding territories on lawns and golf courses and natural habitats in open fields. Kōlea have a habit of running in short bursts, then stopping to search for insects. The kōlea can be seen from August to April on Kauai.
Uaukani (wedge-tailed shearwater, Puffinus pacificus) spend the winter at sea, traveling as far as the Gulf of Panama, and return to Hawaii in the spring to breed. They nest in burrows that provide protection from predators and intense tropical weather. Adults leave the colony by day to fish and return at dusk to feed their chicks. At night, courting shearwaters make eerie moaning sounds, which inspired their Hawaiian name uaukani. Uaukani can be seen from March to November.
It has a glossy black back and white belly and a black bill that is sharply hooked at the tip. Its claws are well adapted for burrow excavation and climbing.
Ulili (wandering tattler, Tringa incana) is about the same size as the kōlea,  from bill to tail. They are slate-gray in color with very yellow legs.
Akekeke (ruddy turnstone, Arenaria interpres) is a small shorebird easily identified by the bold black and white pattern on its wings, and its black "necklace." Named for its feeding behavior, the ruddy turnstone uses its strong neck and bill to turn over stones in search of prey. It can be seen year round on Kauai but is abundant in spring and fall.

Other Wildlife
Groups of naia (spinner dolphin, Stenella longirostris) play close to shore in spring and summer, entertaining visitors with leaps and spins.
Endangered koholā (humpback whale, Megaptera novaeangliae), which migrate from Alaska to Hawaii each year to mate, give birth, and rear their young, swim offshore from December to April. Koholā can be seen offshore of Kīlauea Point from November to April. Prime time for whale watching is between January and March.
Ilio-holo-i-ka-uaua (Hawaiian monk seal, Monachus schauinslandi) can occasionally be seen hauling out on rocks below the cliffs. Most of these endangered seals live in the remote northwestern area of the Hawaiian Islands and are a rare sight on Hawaii's main islands.
Honu (green turtle, Chelonia mydas) sometimes bob in the waves below Kīlauea Point. Although turtles may be seen mating in Kauai waters, honu typically mate and nest at the place of their birth in the French Frigate Shoals in the Northwestern Hawaiian Islands.

References

National Wildlife Refuges in Hawaii
Protected areas established in 1985
Protected areas of Kauai
1985 establishments in Hawaii